C SEED 201 is a 201-inch MicroLED outdoor TV developed by C SEED Entertainment Systems and designed by Porsche Design Studio.

History
The development of C SEED lasted four years and was done by R&D engineers at C SEED Entertainment Systems in Austria and by the engineering team of Porsche Design Studio in Germany. C SEED has been on the market since 2011 and won the Red Dot design award "Best of the Best 2012".

TV Features

Kinematic
The C SEED is hidden in its underground storage casing waiting for its activation by a simple push of a button on the remote control. After activation, the C SEED 201 column takes 15 seconds to achieve its full height of 4.65 m (15 ft.) with effortless ease. Seven massive LED panels unfold equally soundlessly within the next 25 seconds. The screen can rotate up to 270 degrees and can be raised or lowered to the optimal height for optimum viewing comfort.
With a diagonal of 201 inches (5.11 meters) the display of the C SEED 201 is not only the world's largest TV display but, by using 2,963,520 MicroLEDs it's ten times brighter than a usual TV display too. This enables watching TV in any daylight environment, including direct sunshine.

Sound
The sound system comprises 6 broadband speakers for the left and right audio channels, and 1 subwoofer for low frequencies. The speakers deliver distortion-free sound under all weather conditions.

Multi-source media server
At the core of the TV-system there is a multi-source media server that transfers HD video.

Environmental sensor
The system is equipped with wind, temperature and laser sensors in order to prevent getting damaged through adverse outdoor conditions.

Technical data

 201 inch TV with 2,963,520 MicroLEDs
 LED TV technology with max. 4.000 nits brightness / fully daylight compatible
 6 speakers and 1 subwoofer
 Waterproof
 Rotatable through 270 degrees
 Wireless 2.4 GHz remote control

External links
Uncrate: https://uncrate.com/article/c-seed-outdoor-led-tv/

Wallpaper: https://web.archive.org/web/20120214131033/http://www.wallpaper.com/video/technology/c-seed-201-led-tv-designed-by-porsche-design-studio/984531724001

Interni: http://www.internimagazine.com/newsweekly/project/c-seed-201

Luxury Culture: http://www.luxuryculture.com/home.html?gotourl=WS/articles/0160583/window-shopping/c___seed_tv

Born Rich: https://web.archive.org/web/20120126180912/http://www.bornrich.com/entry/porsche-design-studio-unveils-worlds-largest-led-tv-for-outdoor-theaters

Centurion: https://web.archive.org/web/20130317115832/http://www.centurion-magazine.com/nc/sections/post/towering-tellybox.html

Neiman Marcus: http://www.neimanmarcus.com/christmasbook/fantasy.jsp?cid=CBF13_O5492&cidShots=m,a,b,c,z&r=cat48140738&rdesc=The%20Fantasy%20Gifts&pageName=His_and_Hers_2013&icid=CBF13_05492/

Washington Times: http://www.washingtontimes.com/blog/watercooler/2013/jan/22/biggest-toy-all-201-inch-tv/print/
 Official website
 Porsche Design

References

Mass media technology